George William Arnold from the National Institute of Standards & Technology, Gaithersburg, Maryland was named Fellow of the Institute of Electrical and Electronics Engineers (IEEE) in 2012 for leadership in architecture and protocols for the electric grid and telecommunications network.

References

20th-century births
Living people
Fellow Members of the IEEE
Year of birth missing (living people)
Place of birth missing (living people)
American electrical engineers